The 12th Politburo of the Chinese Communist Party was elected at the 1st Plenary Session of the 12th Central Committee on September 13, 1982, consisting of 25 members and 3 alternate members. It served until 1987.  It was preceded by the 11th Politburo of the Chinese Communist Party. This politburo was reorganized in September 1985, with a retirement of senior members and election of new members.  It was succeeded by the 13th Politburo of the Chinese Communist Party.

Members (25)
Hu Yaobang, General Secretary of the Party Central Committee and member of the Politburo Standing Committee
Ye Jianying, member of the Politburo Standing Committee
Deng Xiaoping, member of the Politburo Standing Committee
Zhao Ziyang, member of the Politburo Standing Committee
Li Xiannian, member of the Politburo Standing Committee
Chen Yun, member of the Politburo Standing Committee
Others in stroke order of surnames:
Wan Li
Xi Zhongxun
Wang Zhen
Wei Guoqing
Ulanhu
Fang Yi
Deng Yingchao
Li Desheng
Yang Shangkun
Yang Dezhi
Yu Qiuli
Song Renqiong
Zhang Tingfa
Hu Qiaomu
Nie Rongzhen
Ni Zhifu
Xu Xiangqian
Peng Zhen
Liao Chengzhi (died in June 1983)

Alternate members (3)
Yao Yilin
Qin Jiwei
Chen Muhua

Members retiring in September 1985 (10)
Ye Jianying
Deng Yingchao
Xu Xiangqian
Nie Rongzhen
Ulanhu
Wang Zhen
Wei Guoqing
Li Desheng
Song Renqiong
Zhang Tingfa

Members elected in September 1985 (6)
at the 5th Plenary Session of the 12th Central Committee:
Tian Jiyun
Qiao Shi
Li Peng
Wu Xueqian
Hu Qili
Yao Yilin (previously alternate member)

Membership after September 1985

Members (20)
Hu Yaobang, General Secretary of the Party Central Committee until January 1987; member of the Politburo Standing Committee
Deng Xiaoping, member of the Politburo Standing Committee
Zhao Ziyang, member of the Politburo Standing Committee; appointed Acting General Secretary of the Party Central Committee in January 1987
Li Xiannian, member of the Politburo Standing Committee
Chen Yun, member of the Politburo Standing Committee

Others in stroke order of surnames:
Wan Li
Xi Zhongxun
Fang Yi
Tian Jiyun
Qiao Shi
Li Peng
Yang Shangkun
Yang Dezhi
Wu Xueqian
Yu Qiuli
Hu Qiaomu
Hu Qili
Yao Yilin
Ni Zhifu
Peng Zhen

Alternate members (2)
Qin Jiwei
Chen Muhua

References

External links 
  Gazette of the 1st Session of the 12th CCP Central Committee

Politburo of the Chinese Communist Party
1982 in China